Suzanne Weil is an American arts administrator and producer who developed Walker Art Center's Performing Arts Department in Minneapolis, was Director of the Dance Program at the National Endowment for the Arts, was Senior Vice-President for Programming at PBS (5) and Executive Director of the Sundance Institute.

Professional career

 Executive Director, The Sundance Institute, 1989-1991. 
 Senior Vice President, Programming and Public Information, Public Broadcasting Service, 1981-1988. 
 Director, Dance Program, National Endowment for Arts, Washington, 1976-1978. 
 Performing Arts Coordinator, Walker Art Center, Minneapolis, 1969-1976.

Career highlights
Walker Art Center Performing Arts Program: Notable for commissioning residencies with composers John Cage, Philip Glass, and Steve Reich; choreographers Merce Cunningham, Twyla Tharp (Tharp's dance Sue's Leg is dedicated to Weil), Trisha Brown, Yvonne Rainer, and David Gordon; and theater companies Mabou Mines, Meredith Monk, and the Manhattan Project Company. Garrison Keillor has thanked her for being the first to put him on a stage. Weil produced over 200 legendary rock and jazz concerts for Walker Art Center that were often staged at the Guthrie Theater, including Miles Davis, The Who, Led Zeppelin, The Mothers of Invention, the Grateful Dead and Elton John.

PBS: Notable for programming such as Shoah, Eyes on the Prize, My Dinner With Andre, and The Thin Blue Line.
PBS President Bruce L. Christensen described Weil's contributions to PBS and public television as "legion and extraordinary...her particular genius has been her ability to recognize and nurture creativity. Her unfailing eye for quality, and talent for bringing great minds together, have resulted in many of television's finest moments over the last ten years, from the presentation of Shoah to Baryshnikov by Tharp."

Independent Producer: Weil served as an Associate Producer of the documentary Sketches of Frank Gehry and has also served on the Board of Directors of Baryshnikov Arts Center where she helped establish the Cage Cunningham Fund

References 

Living people
Year of birth missing (living people)
Place of birth missing (living people)
American arts administrators
Women arts administrators